William Banks (born 2 November 1880) was a Scottish footballer who played in the Football League for Manchester City.

References

1880 births
20th-century deaths
Year of death unknown
Scottish footballers
English Football League players
Association football midfielders
Glenbuck Cherrypickers F.C. players
Kilmarnock F.C. players
Manchester City F.C. players
Portsmouth F.C. players
Nithsdale Wanderers F.C. players